Luigi Boccherini's Symphony Op.12 No.4 in D minor is a symphony in three movements. Also known as La casa del Diavolo  (meaning the devil's house in English), it  was composed in 1771.

Movements

I. 	Andante sostenuto - Allegro assai
II. Andantino con moto
III. Andante sostenuto (repetition of the 1st movement) - Allegro con molto

Orchestration 
flute - 2 oboes 2 bassoons

2 horns

strings

See also

List of compositions by Luigi Boccherini

References

1771 compositions
Compositions by Luigi Boccherini